Matalan is a British fashion and homeware retailer based in Knowsley, Merseyside. It was established by John Hargreaves in 1985, and is still owned by the Hargreaves family. , the company employed over 13,000, and had 230 stores in the United Kingdom, together with franchise stores in the Middle East.

History 

John Hargreaves opened the first Matalan store in 1985 at Bamber Bridge, near Preston, Lancashire. There were fifty stores by 1995, and in 1997, the company moved its headquarters from Preston to Skelmersdale, also in Lancashire. The company was floated on the London Stock Exchange in 1998, but taken private again by the Hargreaves family in October 2006.

During 2009, John Hargreaves sought to sell off Matalan, but by February 2010, had failed to find buyers willing to meet the £1.5 billion price. Jason Hargreaves was appointed managing director in July 2013. The headquarters moved to a purpose built site at Knowsley, Merseyside in 2014. The company won approval for this scheme in October 2012.

Controversy
Matalan was among the companies that sourced clothes from the Rana Plaza factory in Bangladesh which collapsed, killing 1,134, in April 2013. In July 2014, they were the focus of a campaign by 38 Degrees and Labour Behind the Label, for failing to contribute to the official compensation fund coordinated by the ILO. This was in contrast to some of their main competitors, such as Primark who contributed $9 million.

After pressure, they announced that they would contribute an undisclosed amount. It was later revealed that they had paid £60,000 into the fund, which labour rights campaigns challenged as being an insufficient amount compared with other retailers.

Structure 
Matalan Retail Limited is a wholly owned subsidiary of Missouri Topco Limited, a holding company which is based in Guernsey, and is controlled by the Hargreaves family.

In the Middle East, the Matalan brand is franchised to BTC Fashion General Trading, based in Qatar. BTC have stores in Bahrain, Jordan, Oman, Qatar, Saudi Arabia, Egypt and the United Arab Emirates.

There is also at least one store in Georgia (at the City Mall, Tbilisi).

Management 
In June 2020, Matalan confirmed that they would name a new chairman and a new chief commercial officer less than a month after John Mills stated he would step down from the board. Steve Johnson succeeded Mills as the next chairperson of the value retailer, while James Brown moved into the completely new Chief Commercial Officer position at the company.

References

External links

 
 Middle East Official Website

British companies established in 1985
Retail companies established in 1985
Clothing retailers of the United Kingdom
Companies formerly listed on the London Stock Exchange
Companies based in Merseyside